A luminous efficiency function or luminosity function represents the average spectral sensitivity of human visual perception of light. It is based on subjective judgements of which of a pair of different-colored lights is brighter, to describe relative sensitivity to light of different wavelengths.  It is not an absolute reference to any particular individual, but is a standard observer representation of visual sensitivity of theoretical human eye. It is valuable as a baseline for experimental purposes, and in colorimetry.  Different luminous efficiency functions apply under different lighting conditions, varying from photopic in brightly lit conditions through mesopic to scotopic under low lighting conditions.  When not specified, the luminous efficiency function generally refers to the photopic luminous efficiency function.

It also forms the central color matching function in the CIE 1931 color space.

Details
There are two luminous efficiency functions in common use. For everyday light levels, the photopic luminosity function best approximates the response of the human eye. For low light levels, the response of the human eye changes, and the scotopic curve applies. The photopic curve is the CIE standard curve used in the CIE 1931 color space.

The luminous flux (or visible power) in a light source is defined by the photopic luminosity function. The following equation calculates the total luminous flux in a source of light:
 
where
 Φv is the luminous flux, in lumens;
 Φe,λ is the spectral radiant flux, in watts per nanometre;
 (λ), also known as V(λ), is the luminosity function, dimensionless;
 λ is the wavelength, in nanometres.

Formally, the integral is the inner product of the luminosity function with the spectral power distribution. In practice, the integral is replaced by a sum over discrete wavelengths for which tabulated values of the luminous efficiency function are available.

The small excess fractional value comes from the slight mismatch between the definition of the lumen and the peak of the luminosity function.

The number 683 is connected to the modern (1979) definition of the candela, the unit of luminous intensity. This arbitrary number made the new definition give numbers equivalent to those from the old definition of the candela.

Improvements to the standard
The CIE 1924 photopic V(λ) luminosity function, which is included in the CIE 1931 color-matching functions as the (λ) function, has long been acknowledged to underestimate the contribution of the blue end of the spectrum to perceived luminance. There have been numerous attempts to improve the standard function, to make it more representative of human vision. Judd in 1951, improved by Vos in 1978, resulted in a function known as CIE VM(λ). More recently, Sharpe, Stockman, Jagla & Jägle (2005) developed a function consistent with the Stockman & Sharpe cone fundamentals; their curves are plotted in the figure above.

ISO standard
The ISO standard is ISO/CIE FDIS 11664-1. The standard provides an incremental table by nm of each value in the visible range.

Scotopic luminosity

The standard scotopic luminous efficiency function or V(λ) was adopted by the CIE in 1951, based on measurements by Wald (1945) and by Crawford (1949).

Color blindness 

Color blindness changes the sensitivity of the eye as a function of wavelength. For people with protanopia, the peak of the eye's response is shifted toward the short-wave part of the spectrum (approximately 540 nm), while for people suffering deuteranopia, there is a slight shift in the peak of the spectrum, to about 560 nm. People with protanopia have essentially no sensitivity to light of wavelengths more than 670 nm.

Most non-primate mammals have the same luminous efficiency function as people with protanopia.  Their insensitivity to long-wavelength red light makes it possible to use such illumination while studying the nocturnal life of animals.

For older people with normal color vision, the crystalline lens may become slightly yellow due to cataracts, which moves the maximum of sensitivity to the red part of the spectrum and narrows the range of perceived wavelengths.

See also
 Apparent magnitude
 Color vision
 Quantum efficiency, the image sensor equivalent
 A-weighting and equal-loudness contour, related sound concepts

References

CIE documents

Curve data

External links
 Color and Research Vision Laboratory - luminous efficiency data tables

Physical quantities
Photometry